Knowsley Safari is a safari park and tourist attraction near Prescot, England. It is a member of the British and Irish Association of Zoos and Aquariums (BIAZA) and the European Association of Zoos and Aquaria (EAZA). It contributes to conservation and research through links with conservation projects and its links with universities in nearby Liverpool, as well as Chester and Manchester.

History
The park was opened in July 1971 by Edward Stanley, 18th Earl of Derby and Jimmy Chipperfield using the expertise of general manager Laurence Tennant MBE, formerly the Chief Game Warden of Parks in Uganda and Botswana. Due to the popularity of this route, an additional  of road was added in 1973, and camels, buffalo, white rhino, and tigers were added to the park. Over the years, a few modifications have been made. For instance, tigers are now displayed in enclosures within the reserve, and a bypass around the baboons was built for visitors who are worried about damage to their cars.

The park was also home to a former RAF airfield which closed at the end of World War II. The RAF airbase situated at the safari park was also known as No 49 SLG or RAF Knowsley Park and was in use between 13 May 1942 – November 1944.

The park has hosted several sporting events including the Olympic torch relay, watched by 6,000 children and families in June 2012. The park hosted the finish of Stage Two of the 2012 Tour of Britain cycling event and hosted Stage Three of the 2013 Tour in September of that year.

Zoological collection
Situated around Knowsley Hall on the ancestral estate of the Earl of Derby, the reserve is home to different animals. The Derby Estate have a tradition of keeping animals, ever since the famous artist and nonsense-poet Edward Lear was employed there in the 19th century to paint pictures of the Earl's collection.

Baboons
The park is open to the public and customers drive around the park in their own vehicles. There is a bypass route past the baboons for those who wish to avoid the risk of the baboons damaging their cars. In 2009 the baboons made the news all over the world when a video was released showing how they were intelligent and curious enough to open car roofboxes.

Tiger Trail 
Amur Tiger Trail opened 25 May 2018, home to the Amur Tiger otherwise known as the Siberian Tiger. The area is 10,000m2 and includes forested areas, natural streams and ponds.

The Equatorial Trail 
This exhibit focuses on animals who thrive in habitats around the Earth's Equator. The exhibit also houses the 'Equatorial Express', a small train which visitors can ride to gain a unique viewpoint of the animals. 4 animal species are housed in this exhibit, the South American tapir, Sitatunga, Rhea and the Capybara.

African Elephant 
Until 2017 the park housed a herd of 4 adult cows named Tana, Ashanti, Nala and Juba. They were transported to Zoo Parc d'Beauval, France to enter the European Breeding Programme and allow for transformations on Knowsley Safari's Foot Safari. Knowsley previously housed a bull named Nissim, who collapsed in June 2014. Knowsley also recently lost their cow named Shaba due to a long battle with elephant arthritis.

Southern White Rhinoceros 
Knowsley's crash of 11 adult rhinos is one of the most successful and genetically diverse breeding groups in Europe. The latest calf (as at 4 June 2016), Nomvula (Mother of Rain – a reference to the recent wet weather), born to mum Meru and is the 19th to be born at the facility in the last 40 years. Nomvula is Meru's 6th calf and was born on 2 January 2016.

Safari Drive 

The Safari Drive is the park's main attraction and contains over 29 species of animals in 7 zones.

Zone 1+11 - Eastern Asia 
This zone contains: Père David's deer, Yak, Kiang and Bactrian camel.

Zone 2+8 - Southern Asia 
This zone contains: Blackbuck, Nilgai, Eld's deer, Chital (Axis Deer) and Barasingha.

Zone 3+4+6 - African Savannah 
Zone 6 is over 100 acres and contains over a mile of road. It is one of Knowsley's two white rhino paddocks and is one of the largest in the UK. This zone contains: Southern White Rhino, Roan antelope, Eland, Lechwe, Wildebeest, Plains Zebra, African Forest Buffalo, Ostritch and Waterbuck.

Zone 5 - African Woodland 
This zone contains: Blesbok and Bongo

Zone 7 - African Savannah 
This zone contains exclusively the Olive baboon, which are famous for removing windscreen wipers and other appendages off vehicles. There is a car-friendly route which totally removes this zone however is still visible from outside the perimeter. This leads directly to zone 6. Various animals have been housed with the baboons in the past. Examples are: Barbary sheep, Nilgai, Ankole Cattle and Zebras. Other types of monkeys were housed with the baboons in the past, which were: Hamadryas baboons, Chacma baboons, Yellow Baboons and Drills, according to the 1972 guidebook.

Zone 9 - Eurasia 
This zone contains: European Bison, Fallow Deer and European Moose

Zone 10 - African Savannah 
This zone contains: Lion, and the Somali wild ass. This zone previously housed African wild dog, Iberian Wolf and Siberian Tiger.

Railway and other attractions
The park features a  gauge railway, 'The Lakeside Railway', on which visitors may tour parts of the site. There is also a collection of amusements and fairground rides on site plus paintballing, off-road driving challenges, and aerial extreme ropewalks.

A baboon house was added in 2006, along with African wild dogs that same year, a lion and tiger house in 2007. Red river hogs and marmosets were also added to the walkaround section, as well as an outdoor pool.

Animal care
In January 2011, local animal rights activists held a peaceful demonstration after an inspection by government vets found one instance of a breach of regulations on the disposal of animal ‘by-products’. The park has since installed an enclosure for the storage of animal carcasses before disposal.

References

External links

Knowsley Safari official website

Metropolitan Borough of Knowsley
Tourist attractions in Merseyside
Zoos in England
Buildings and structures in Merseyside
Zoos established in 1971
1971 establishments in England
Safari parks